Kim Heiselberg (born 21 September 1977 in Denmark) is a Danish retired footballer who now works as a pig farmer.

Career 
Heiselberg started his senior career with Esbjerg FB. After that, he played for Sunderland A.F.C. In 2000, he signed for Swindon Town in the English Football League Second Division. where he made two appearances and scored zero goals.

References

External links 
 Whatever happened to... Kim Heiselberg? 
 Kim has a new goal
 'FIVE OF THE BEST' - Foreign Imports 
 Swindon-Town-FC.co.uk Profile
 DBU Profile 
 Danish Wikipedia Page

Esbjerg fB players
Expatriate footballers in England
Sunderland A.F.C. players
Association football defenders
Living people
1977 births
Swindon Town F.C. players
Danish men's footballers
Danish expatriate men's footballers